A midsommarkrans (Midsummer wreath) is a ring-shaped wreath made of flowers and leaves. A midsommarkrans is usually worn during the Midsummer celebrations in Sweden. It is the traditional headgear of a Sommar i P1 host during the presentation show in early June. They are made to look festive and celebrate midsummer.

References

Swedish culture
Summer